Tinoliodes is a genus of tiger moths in the family Erebidae described by Wileman in 1915.

Species
Tinoliodes benguetensis Wileman, 1915
Tinoliodes dehanna (Pagenstecher, 1885)

References

Callimorphina
Moth genera